Mikhail Borisovich Golant (3 February 1923 – 7 February 2001) was a Soviet and Russian scientist and engineer. Best known as a leader of Soviet design of backward-wave tubes, he was awarded the Lenin Prize, the USSR State Prize, and the State Prize of the Russian Federation. He worked with Nikolay Devyatkov on the application of EHF therapy.

Biography
Mikhail Golant was born to well-educated parents in Moscow on 3 February 1923. His father, Boris Golant, was a food chemist; his mother was a doctor of medicine. Each of his siblings and cousins also went on to earn advanced scientific degrees.

Mikhail Golant began to attend the Moscow Power Engineering Institute (MPEI) in 1940. His studies were interrupted by the military draft following the German invasion of the Soviet Union in 1941, when Golant was eighteen. He took part in the Red Army's campaigns against both Nazi Germany and Imperial Japan as a sapper from 1941 to 1945 and was wounded on three occasions.

Golant returned to the Moscow Power Engineering Institute following his demobilization in April 1946 and graduated with distinction in 1951.

Golant's research teams developed a novel approach to designing backward-wave tubes in the late 1950s and early 1960s. Though superseded by advances in semiconductors, Golant's designs made possible a variety of experiments and investigations using millimeter and submillimeter wave ranges.

In an obituary summarizing the highlights of Golant's career, the Nobel Prize winner Alexander Prokhorov and E. M. Dianov, Academicians of the Russian Academy of Sciences, wrote:

He died on 7 February 2001.

Honors and awards

Military
 Order of the Red Star (twice)
 Medal "For the Defence of Leningrad"
 Medal "For the Victory over Germany in the Great Patriotic War 1941–1945"
 Medal "For the Victory over Japan"

Civilian
 Lenin Prize
 USSR State Prize
 State Prize of the Russian Federation (2000)

References

External links
 U.S. Patent for M. B. Golant et al.: Slow Wave Structure for Tubes Comprising a Stack of Metal Laminations Parallel to the Axis of the Electron Beam (United States Patent No. 3436690)

1923 births
2001 deaths
Lenin Prize winners
Writers from Moscow
Russian inventors
Soviet engineers
20th-century Russian engineers
Soviet inventors
Soviet military personnel of World War II
State Prize of the Russian Federation laureates
Recipients of the USSR State Prize